Wojciech Sławomir Smoczyński (born March 12, 1945 in Głowno near Łowicz) is a Polish linguist. He is a tenured professor at the Department of General and Indo-European linguistics at Jagiellonian University, and since 1996 also the head of the Department of Indo-European Studies.

From 1962 to 1967 he studied Slavic, Lithuanian and Gothic at Warsaw University. In 1977 he defended his thesis at Jagiellonian University. In 2000 he received the title of professor, and subsequently full professorship in 2002.

He is the author of over 200 articles, five monographs and the Etymological Dictionary of the Lithuanian Language (Polish: Słownik etymologiczny języka litewskiego), as well as the editor of two conference proceedings.

He received an honorary doctorate from the University of Vilnius.

Literature 
 Employees of the Department of General and Indo-European linguistics at the Jagiellonian University

References

External links 

 Article on Smoczyński receiving an honorary doctorate of the University of Vilnius
 Interview with Smoczyński - Part 1
 with Smoczyński - Part 2

Balticists
1945 births
Linguists from Poland
Indo-Europeanists
Living people
Academic staff of Jagiellonian University
University of Warsaw alumni
Academic staff of the University of Warsaw